Hirzenhain is a municipality in the Wetteraukreis, in Hesse, Germany. It is located approximately 45 kilometers northeast of Frankfurt am Main. It has a population of around 2,800.

History
From 1943 to 1945 the area was the site of :de:Arbeitserziehungslager Hirzenhain, a camp for forced labour by convicted criminals and prisoners of war, run by the Gestapo. On 25 March 1945, shortly before the end of the war, a troop of SS killed 87 inmates of the camp. There is a memorial to the victims in the municipality. The dead were reinterred at Arnsburg Abbey in 1960.

References

Wetteraukreis